Culturescapes (or: CULTURESCAPES) is a multidisciplinary Swiss arts festival devoted to inter-cultural exchange. The festival, which takes place in autumn, showcases the cultural landscape of a different region, nation or city. Although based in Basel the festival extends to many other places in Switzerland, such as Aarau, Bern, Chur, Zurich, Geneva or Bellinzona. Founded in the year 2002, the festival mainly focussed on Eastern European countries at the beginning. However, with festival editions devoted to countries like Turkey, Azerbaijan, China or Israel the festival gradually expanded its scope. To mark its tenth anniversary in 2012 Culturescapes focussed on Moscow, for the first time placing the topography of a city at the centre of the festival. The 2013 Balkans festival edition highlighted not only a country but an entire cultural region. 2015 Iceland was presented. At the same time was also announced that in the future the festival will take place in the biennial rhythm. The next two editions took place in 2017 with a focus on Greece and in 2019 with a focus on Poland.

From 2021, CULTURESCAPES is opening a new festival series dedicated to critical zones that extend beyond the boundaries of nation states. In 2021, the focus was on the Amazon region. In 2023, the focus will be on the Sahara, in 2025 on the Himalayas and in 2027 on the oceans.

CULTURESCAPES is a network festival, cooperating with existing arts venues in Switzerland, such as the Kaserne Basek or the Museum Tinguely. The festival is usually supported by Swiss federal agencies, e.g. DEZA, county authorities as well as state departments of the guest country. The festival is interdisciplinary. Next to performing arts like theatre and dance the festival also presents fine arts, graphic arts, craft, literature, film and new Media. In the programming section entitled „Focus" the history, current affairs and popular culture of the focus region are discussed and analysed. This largely happens in cooperation with Swiss education institutions such as the University of Basel or the University of Zurich. Some of the countries and topics chosen have led to protests and debate. Such topics include the Armenian genocide or the Conflicts in the Middle East. In a public letter, Culturescapes was requested by BDS Switzerland, a group advocating the boycott of Israel, not to host the Culturescapes Israel 2011 festival. The BDS Switzerland also protested at some of the events of the festival.

Foundation 

The original idea behind CULTURESCAPES was to draw attention to the transformative processes taking place in the less well-known countries of the former Eastern Bloc, as manifested in the art produced there. Gradually, however, the focus shifted to cultural landscapes with a long tradition of artistic diversity, whose current form bears the stamp of a unique combination of historical, political, social and economic factors.
Founder and curator of all the festival editions to date is Dutch arts manager Jurriaan Cooiman. Since 2009 CULTURESCAPES functions as a charitable foundation. Before this date, the festival had been run by the group Performing Arts Services Basel (PASS).

Festivals

Literature 
 Culturescapes Aserbaidschan: Kultur, Geschichte und Politik zwischen Kaukasus und Kaspischem Meer. Christoph Merian Verlag, Basel 2009, .
 Culturescapes China: Chinas Kulturszene ab 2000. Christoph Merian Verlag, Basel 2010, .
 Culturescapes Israel: Kultur im Spannungsfeld des Nahen Ostens. Christoph Merian Verlag, Basel 2011, .
 Culturescapes Moskau: Schauplatz der Inszenierungen. Christoph Merian Verlag, Basel 2012, .
 Culturescapes Balkan: Kosovo 2.0 - Balkart. Christoph Merian Verlag, Basel 2013, .
 Culturescapes Island: Zwischen Sagas und Pop. Christoph Merian Verlag, Basel 2015, .
Culturescapes Greece/ Griechenland: Archaeology of the Future / Archäologie der Zukunft.  Christoph Merian Verlag, Basel 2017, . 
«ON THE EDGE»: Culturescapes Poland. .
 CULTURESCAPES 2021 Amazonia: Amazonia. Anthology as Cosmology. Sternberg Press, Berlin 2021, .

References 

Art festivals in Switzerland
Autumn events in Switzerland